"Sexy Love" is the fourth and final US single and the second and final international single released from American R&B singer Ne-Yo's debut album, In My Own Words (2006). The song reached number seven on the Billboard Hot 100. In the United Kingdom, the single charted at number 21 on downloads alone. It rose 16 places and peaked at number five once the physical single was released.

Background
Unlike his previous song "So Sick", "Sexy Love" describes a man's feelings towards his girlfriend and that he is deeply in love with her that he's somewhat addicted to her, and that there's nothing better he'd rather do than to be with his girlfriend. Ne-Yo performed the song on the July 6, 2006, episode of So You Think You Can Dance. On June 27, 2006, he also performed it at the 2006 BET Awards. A remix of the song was made, featuring Candace Jones. Another remix was featuring Roc-A-Fella artist Tru Life. There is also a remix to the song that features rapper Joe Budden as well as a version that features rapper Juelz Santana.

Composition
"Sexy Love" is written in the key of E major with a tempo of 94 beats per minute. The song follows a chord progression of ABGm7, and Ne-Yo's vocals span from G4 to B5.

Music video
A music video for "Sexy Love" was directed by Anthony Mandler.
The clip is mainly supposed to demonstrate that because he is completely in love with his girlfriend, he'd rather spend the whole day with her, thus disconnecting himself from the world around him (thus referring to the verse in the song, "And I just can't think of anything else I'd rather do; Than to hear you sing, sing my name the way you do"). Ne-Yo's character's disconnection with the world is demonstrated through his lack of concern or deliberately ignoring the eviction notices he receives throughout the music video (in which are slid under his door). It is not clearly explained why he is being evicted; since Ne-Yo doesn't seem to be working or going much of anyplace, failure to pay the bill is most likely the reason.

Track listings

Charts

Weekly charts

Year-end charts

Certifications

Release history

References

External links
 "Sexy Love" Music Video

2005 songs
2006 singles
Def Jam Recordings singles
Music videos directed by Anthony Mandler
Ne-Yo songs
Song recordings produced by Stargate (record producers)
Songs written by Mikkel Storleer Eriksen
Songs written by Ne-Yo
Songs written by Tor Erik Hermansen